Gruhalakshmi is a 1955 Indian Tamil-language film directed by H. V. Babu. Edited by M.S. Parthasarathy. The film stars M. K. Radha and Anjali Devi.

Cast
List adapted from the database of Film News Anandan

Male cast
M. K. Radha
V. Nagayya
Raghuveer
Peer Mohamed
T. E. Krishnamachari

Female cast
Anjali Devi
T. V. Kumudhini
Bombay Meenakshi
Padma

Production
The film was produced by H. M. Reddy who earlier produced and directed the Telugu version Gruhalakshmi in 1938. This Tamil version was directed by H. V. Babu (Hanumappa Viswanath Babu). H. M. Reddy wrote the story and the dialogues were written by Udayakumar. D. L. Narayana handled the cinematography while the editing was done by M.S. Parthasarathy. Art direction was by A. K. Sekar and the choreography was done by Natraj. Still photography was done by Eswar Babu. The film was made at Film Centre, Madras.

Soundtrack
Music was composed by B. S. Kala, Sarala, T. A. Kalyanam and G. Nataraj while the lyrics were penned by Papanasam Sivan and Guhan. Playback singers are P. Leela, Jikki, K. Jamuna Rani, Padma, Ghantasala and Natarajan.

A song "Kaalai Thookki Nindru Aadum", penned by Carnatic music composer Marimutha Pillai was included in the film.

References

External links

 - A song sung by Jikki in the film.

Indian drama films
Tamil remakes of Telugu films
Indian black-and-white films
1950s Tamil-language films
Films scored by T. A. Kalyanam
Films scored by B. S. Kalla
Films scored by G. Natarajan
1955 drama films